Joseph Torres (born September 3, 1982) is an American professional baseball assistant pitching coach for the Cleveland Guardians of Major League Baseball.

Career
Torres attended Gateway High School in Kissimmee, Florida. As a pitcher for the school's baseball team, he had a 1.58 earned run average (ERA) and 370 strikeouts in  innings pitched. As a senior, he had a 0.38 ERA with 128 strikeouts in 55 innings. Torres accepted a scholarship to play college baseball for the University of Miami.

The Anaheim Angels selected Torres in the first round, with the 10th overall selection, of the 2000 Major League Baseball draft. Torres signed with the Angels, receiving a $2.08 million signing bonus. He pitched for the Boise Hawks in 2000 after he signed. In 2002, he had a 3.52 ERA with the Cedar Rapids Kernels. He pitched 50 innings in 2003 around injuries and missed the 2004 season due to having Tommy John surgery. He struggled with Cedar Rapids and the Rancho Cucamonga Quakes in 2005. A free agent, Torres signed with the Chicago White Sox organization before the 2007 season. He played for the Birmingham Barons in 2008 and signed with the Texas Rangers organization for the 2009 season. In 2012, while pitching for the Colorado Springs Sky Sox for the Colorado Rockies organization, Torres was suspended for 50 games when he tested positive for an amphetamine.

In 2017, Torres was the pitching coach for the Arizona League Indians. He coached for the Lake County Captains in 2018 and the Lynchburg Hillcats in 2019. After the 2019 season, Cleveland named Torres their minor league pitching coordinator. He was named the assistant pitching coach on the major league staff before the 2022 season.

References

External links

Living people
1982 births
Baseball pitchers
Boise Hawks players
Provo Angels players
Cedar Rapids Kernels players
Rancho Cucamonga Quakes players
Arizona League Angels players
Winston-Salem Warthogs players
Birmingham Barons players
Bristol White Sox players
Kannapolis Intimidators players
Criollos de Caguas players
Inland Empire 66ers of San Bernardino players
Frisco RoughRiders players
Tulsa Drillers players
Colorado Springs Sky Sox players
Toros del Este players
York Revolution players
Somerset Patriots players
Major League Baseball pitching coaches